Gogol Street is a street in Tsentralny and Dzerzhinsky districts of Novosibirsk, Russia. It consists of two fragments. The first fragment starts at the intersection with Sovetskaya and Chelyuskintsev streets and runs east, crosses Krasny Avenue, Michurin, Kamenskaya, Shamshin Family, Olga Zhilina, Ippodromskaya streets and forms the intersection with the Seleznyov and Koshurnikov streets, then the street is interrupted by Beryozovaya Roshcha Park. The second street fragment branches off from Dzerzhinsky Prospekt, then runs north-east parallel to it, crosses Krasin, Korolyov, Kombinatskaya streets and connects with Trikotazhnaya Street.

History
In 1908, 37 nameless streets of the city received names. Among them, 21 streets were named after Russian writers and one street was named in honor of the Russian painter. This street was named after Nikolai Gogol.

In 1911, the New City Cemetery was opened on the street.

August 29, 1947, Novosibirsk Zoo was opened on the street. Then it has been gradually moved from Gogol Street to Zayeltsovsky District. In 2000, the zoo finally moved to the new place.

Architecture
 Officers' House is a building on the corner of Krasny Avenue and Gogol Street. It was built in 1916–1925. Architects: Andrey Kryachkov, B. M. Blazhovsky.

Educational institutions
 Fraules Dance Centre
 School No. 18
 School No. 82

Gallery

Transportation

Metro
Three Novosibirsk metro stations are located on the street: Krasny Prospekt, Sibirskaya and Marshala Pokryshkina. Also Beryozovaya Roshcha Station is located near the street.

Notable residents
 Andrey Zvyagintsev is a Russian film director and screenwriter.

See also
 Frunze Street

References

Tsentralny City District, Novosibirsk
Dzerzhinsky City District, Novosibirsk
Streets in Novosibirsk